Snidow is a surname. Notable people with the surname include:

Conley Snidow (1916–2007), American football and basketball coach and college athletics administrator
Ron Snidow (1941–2009), American football player